Ryan Field is a stadium in the central United States, located in Evanston, Illinois, a suburb north of Chicago. Near the campus of Northwestern University, it is primarily used for American football, and is the home field of the Northwestern Wildcats of the Big Ten Conference. It is the only FBS stadium without permanent lighting, and its current seating capacity is 47,130.

Opened  in 1926, it was named Dyche Stadium for William Dyche, class of 1882, Evanston mayor from 1895 to 1899 and overseer of the building project. The stadium was renamed Ryan Field in 1997 in honor of the family of Aon Corporation founder Patrick G. Ryan, who was then the chairman of Northwestern's board of trustees. The renaming was made by the other members of the board in recognition of the Ryan family's leadership and numerous contributions to Northwestern, including the lead gift to the Campaign for Athletic Excellence, Northwestern's fundraising drive for athletic facilities.

History

At the time it was constructed, Dyche Stadium was considered one of the finest college football stadiums in the country. The stadium originally consisted of two semi-circular grandstands on either sideline, with the west (home) sideline having a small, curved upper deck whose 2 ends abut in matching concrete towers. The purpose of the curved grandstands was to maximize the number of fans sitting close to the action. A preliminary proposal featured both the west and east grandstands having symmetrical triple decks but was never realized because of cost overruns resulting from an accelerated construction schedule and average attendance figures that rarely approached 50,000. End zone seating was later added in the south, and in 1952 McGaw Memorial Hall was built beyond the north end zone.

The stadium had a natural grass surface when it opened. It switched to artificial turf in 1973 and was used until 1996.

The Chicago Bears played their first home game of the 1970 season vs. the Philadelphia Eagles at Dyche Stadium on September 27 as an experiment; the NFL had required that the Bears move out of Wrigley Field because its seating capacity was under 50,000, which was below the minimum set out by the newly constituted post-merger NFL. Also, the Chicago Cubs were in a September pennant race with the Pittsburgh Pirates and New York Mets in the National League East. If Wrigley Field was needed for postseason baseball games, the temporary grandstand for football along the east sideline (in right and center field) would not be available until late October. After Evanston residents petitioned city officials to block the team from moving there permanently and the Big Ten Conference opposed the Bears' use of Northwestern's stadium, the Bears ended up moving to Chicago's Soldier Field the following year.

The stadium hosted the 1932 Women's (July 16) and 1948 Men's (July 9–10) US Olympic Trials for track and field. The venue also hosted the NCAA track and field championships in 1943. 

It also hosted the summer College All-Star Game in 1943 and 1944, which had usually been instead held at Chicago's Soldier Field. Both games were played at night with the use of temporary lights.  The college all-stars held their practices for the game at Dyche Stadium in years such as 1934 and 1935.

Pending replacement 

On September 22, 2021, Northwestern announced that the Ryan family had donated $480 million to the university, the largest donation in its history. The donation supported several academic initiatives and provide initial funding for the replacement of Ryan Field by a new stadium at the current site. Almost exactly a year later, Northwestern announced initial design concepts for the new stadium, and also announced that the Ryans had committed to adding to the initial stadium gift. The new Ryan Field will seat 35,000, more than 12,000 less than the current stadium, and will feature a canopy to better focus light and noise toward the field and away from the surrounding neighborhood. Also, it will be entirely privately funded. It will have a much smaller footprint than the current stadium; Northwestern released a preliminary schematic indicating that the most distant seats would be roughly the same distance from the sidelines as the back rows of the lower deck of the (much larger) Notre Dame Stadium. No date for construction has been announced; this will presumably depend on fundraising progress.

Renaming controversy
Northwestern's decision to rename Dyche Stadium to Ryan Field defied the university's own 1926 resolution that forbade such a change.  School officials said that a private institution can override previous boards' decisions, and dismissed the earlier resolution as a "show of appreciation."  But NU did not explain why a mere gesture of appreciation would expressly state that any football stadium at any location would retain the name Dyche, as indeed the 1926 resolution does.  The Dyche family wasn't notified of the change; NU claimed that the only descendant they found was a grandniece, despite other family members living in Chicago and being listed in the phone book.  After the family protested, NU said it was willing to install an informational plaque at the stadium, noting its former name.

Transportation
The closest transit stations are Metra commuter railroad's Central Street station and Chicago Transit Authority's Central station on the Purple Line.

In popular culture
Parts of The Express: The Ernie Davis Story, a 2008 film about Syracuse University Heisman Trophy winner Ernie Davis starring Rob Brown as Davis, and Dennis Quaid as Davis' Syracuse coach, Ben Schwartzwalder, were filmed at Ryan Field.

Parts of Four Friends, a 1981 film directed by Arthur Penn, were filmed at Dyche Stadium.

See also
 List of NCAA Division I FBS football stadiums

References

External links

 
 Ryan Field History, Northwestern University Archives, Evanston, Illinois

College football venues
Northwestern Wildcats football venues
American football venues in Illinois
Chicago Bears stadiums
Defunct National Football League venues
Sports venues completed in 1926
1926 establishments in Illinois